The Buengui River is a small river of Gabon.

References

Rivers of Gabon